Ludwig Christian Wiener (7 December 1826 Darmstadt – 31 July 1896 Karlsruhe) was a German mathematician who specialized in descriptive geometry. Wiener was also a physicist and philosopher. In  1863, he was the first person to identify qualitatively the internal molecular cause of Brownian motion.

Wiener was the son of a judge and studied architecture and engineering in Giessen. After the state examination in 1848, he became a teacher at the "Höhere Gewerbeschule" in Darmstadt, today the Technische Universität Darmstadt.

The mathematician Hermann Wiener was his son.

Selected publications

Lehrbuch der darstellenden Geometrie, 2 Bände, Teubner, Leipzig 1884, 1887, online at archiv.org: , 
Die ersten Sätze der Erkenntniß, insbesondere das Gesetz der Ursächlichkeit und die Wirklichkeit der Außenwelt, Berlin, Lüderitz 1874
Die Freiheit des Willens, Darmstadt, Brill 1894
Die Grundzüge der Weltordnung, Leipzig, Winter 1863, 
 Über Vielecke und Vielflache, Teubner 1864

References

Thompson, D W., 1992. On Growth and Form. Cambridge Univ. Press. Abridged edition by John Tyler Bonner, p. 45. , .Online in Google Books

Otto Wiener, "Christian Wiener zum 100. Geburtstag", Naturwissenschaften Bd.15, 1927, Issue 4.

1826 births
1896 deaths
University of Giessen alumni
Academic staff of the Karlsruhe Institute of Technology
19th-century German mathematicians
Geometers
Technische Universität Darmstadt alumni